Antony "Tony" Shaw is a barrister of the High Court of New Zealand, and a former lecturer of Law at Victoria University. He holds an LLB & BA from Auckland University; his practice covers civil and criminal matters. He is regarded as an expert on Human Rights Law. Shaw has appeared widely in the District and High Courts of New Zealand including successful appeals to the Court of Appeal, Privy Council and the New Zealand Supreme Court. Shaw has also appeared in the Employment Court of New Zealand and regularly appears before the New Zealand Parole Board.

Biography

Shaw is one of only five barristers who between the years 1848 and 2014 successfully argued a case before the Privy Council in relation to a New Zealand criminal matter  - see: (R v Taito -Privy Council 2002) - (The Supreme Court replaced the Privy Council as the final Appellate body in 2004).

Likewise Shaw along with fellow Barrister Greg King also share the distinction of being the first to win a criminal case before the new Supreme Court of New Zealand - see: (Timoti v Queen - SC 2005).

In 2010, Shaw successfully represented Flag Burner Valerie Morse in the Supreme Court where her conviction for disorderly behavior was quashed. In the same year Shaw represented one of the Waihopai GCSB Spy Base Protesters, they were acquitted at their trial despite their admissions that they had broken into the spy base. Shaw also represented New Zealand's only ever airline high-jacker Asha Ali Abdille who ultimately pleaded guilty to hijacking Eagle Airways Flight 2279. In 2008 Shaw represented Once Were Warriors Author Alan Duff MBE when he was acquitted of failing to remain with a Police Officer when he was pulled over for speeding, and in 2005 Farmer Paul McIntyre who was acquitted of illegally firing a firearm at thieves who were stealing his farm bike. Shaw also represented the successful Plaintiff in the often referenced "Baigents Case", the case famously created a new cause of action for monetary compensation following breaches of the Bill of Rights.

He is the co-author of several books and papers, including books published by Legal Publisher Thomson Reuters and The Oxford University Press.

Recently in the News

Karori homicide: Two women charged in murder investigation after man killed in Wellington suburb 

Shaw obtained interim name suppression pending further reports for the defendant who was charged with murder.

Dilworth School sex abuse investigation 

Shaw obtained interim name suppression for the defendant who was charged with historic sex offences.

Recent cases

Liston-Llyod v The Commissioner of Police - (High Court)

Shaw successfully represented the plaintiff in a judicial review of the police's decision to improperly take DNA from the plaintiff. The decision required the police to pay compensation to plaintiff and ordered that the DNA sample be destroyed.

R v T - (District Court)

Shaw successfully obtained a discharge without conviction for an Airline employee who had been charged with driving with excess breath alcohol. Shaw successfully argued that the effects of a conviction on the Defendant would significantly outweigh the gravity of the offence.

Marteley v The Legal Services Commissioner - (Supreme Court)

Shaw together with fellow Barrister Dr Tony Ellis, successfully appealed a decision of the Court of Appeal where the Plaintiff had been refused Legal Aid to appeal against his conviction for murder. The Supreme Court's decision granted Legal Aid to the Plaintiff (to appeal his conviction) and awarded costs to the Plaintiff of $25,000 and additional general costs and disbursements. The Court created a benchmark and identified [at paragraph 55 of its decision] what it regarded would now be the 7 "critical considerations" for a grant of Legal Aid.

Historic Cases of interest

Ministry of Transport v Noort - Court of Appeal 1991 
In 1991, Shaw successfully represented a Mr Noort in the Court of Appeal (Ministry of Transport v Noort [1992] 3 NZLR 260, 268 (CA) Cooke P.). Mr. Noort had been stopped by the Ministry of Transport (now the Police) and voluntarily submitted to an Alcohol Breath Test which showed he was in excess of the requisite level. Mr Noort was not given the opportunity to consult a lawyer. The Court of Appeal found that this had breached Mr. Noorts rights. The Court determined that when a Court finds that evidence was obtained through a breach of someone’s rights then prima facie the remedy was exclusion of that evidence.  Accordingly, the evidence of the excess Breath Alcohol Test was thrown out. Mr. Noort was then acquitted. This benchmark case, led by Shaw, changed the way Police (then the Ministry of Transport) dealt with alleged offenders and created the necessity for an alleged offender to be told that they had a right to consult a lawyer. It also confirmed the position that the New Zealand Bill of Rights (1990) took precedence over any other enactment, and that evidence obtained in breach of someone’s rights ought to be thrown out. This case is regarded as an important decision and is extensively referred to in cases and texts including references created by the New Zealand Law Commission and numerous decisions of the Courts of New Zealand.

R v Goodwin (No.2) - Court of Appeal 1993 
In 1993, Shaw and fellow Barrister Michael (Mike) Bungay successfully represented the Appellant Goodwin in a Court of Appeal case known as R v Goodwin (No.2). This case is now regarded by the New Zealand Justice Department as the leading (key) case in relation to the Rights of Persons arrested (Pursuant to the New Zealand Bill of Rights). It is referred to in numerous decisions and law texts in New Zealand and overseas including Cambridge University’s Constitutional Law in the United Kingdom – Practice and Principles.  The decision of Goodwin set forth the correct procedure for legal representation, and the effect of improper procedure on evidence and ultimately conviction.

Simpson v The Attorney General (also known as the Baigents case) - Court of Appeal 1994 
In 1994 Shaw successfully represented the Plaintiff Mr. Simpson in (Simpson v Attorney-General [1994] 3 NZLR 667) which if often referred to as "The Baigents case" The Plaintiffs alleged that police officers had persisted in bad faith with the search of the late Mrs. Baigent's house (when they knew that her property had been mistakenly named in a search warrant) The search warrant had been issued for a drug dealers' house. The Plaintiffs sued on the grounds the police breached the Bill of Rights' Act - i.e. the right to be secure against unreasonable search and arrest. The Court of Appeal found that whilst the Bill of Rights did not include specific remedies for a breach of a Section the Act it has to be read in conjunction with New Zealand’s obligations under the International Covenant on Civil and Political Rights. This decision was regarded as ground breaking and created new law, as it created a new civil cause of action (claim for monetary compensation) when someone’s rights were breached.

R v Taito - Privy Council 2002
In 2002 at the Privy Council Shaw and fellow barrister Tony Ellis successfully represented 12 clients who had been convicted of various criminal offences (R v Taito [2002] 3 NZLR 577, 6 HRNZ 539 (Privy Council 2002). The Privy Council found for Shaw and Ellis’s clients and struck down the way the New Zealand Court of Appeal was dealing with criminal appeals where legal aid was refused. The Privy Council ordered new appeals for the 12 with an order that their clients be granted appeals and that they be legally aided. The New Zealand Herald reported at the time that then Member of Parliament (and now a New Zealand Cabinet Minister), Dr Wayne Mapp (who was also a former associate professor of law) said “the decision was a "clear warning shot" to the Government. "This is the Privy Council saying that the criminal appeals system operated by the Court of Appeal was 'unlawful'," he said. The Privy Council since 1848 only granted leave to hear 8 New Zealand criminal appeals. Shaw became one of only 5 Barristers who have ever successfully argued a New Zealand Criminal matter before the Privy Council.

Timoti v Queen - Supreme Court 2005
In 2005, and flowing from the successful decision of the Privy Council in R v Taito [2002] 3 NZLR 577, 6 HRNZ 539 (Privy Council 2002), Shaw along with fellow Barristers Greg King and Catherine Milnes successfully appealed in the Supreme Court the 1999 Murder conviction of Aerengaroa Timoti. Timoti was 23 when he was convicted of Murder for setting fire to his mother's Mt Roskill house while five people were inside (for which he was serving a life sentence). The appeal focused on the partial defence of provocation (pursuant to then section 169 of the Crimes Act 1961) relating to a falling out between Timoti and his father prior to him setting alight to the house. The Supreme Court held that Timoti was provoked "sufficient to deprive a person having the power of self-control of an ordinary person, but otherwise having the characteristics of the accused...", therefore a properly directed Jury might have found Timoti guilty of the lesser charge of Manslaughter which was not available or presented to the Jury as an option when he was convicted in 1999. Timoti's conviction was quashed and a new trial was ordered. It was the first ever-successful criminal appeal to the newly formed Supreme Court (formed in 2004)

R v McIntyre (Far North Farmer Shoots Thieves) - District Court 2005
In 2005, Judge Michael Lance directed the jury in this case to find the accused Paul McIntyre not guilty. This was a re-trial of a charge that Mcintyre unlawfully discharged a firearm in a manner likely to endanger another's safety. In 2002 McIntyre fired at thieves attempting to steal his quad-bike from his Far North Farm. The direction to the jury followed 2 days of submissions and legal argument from Shaw and fellow Barrister Barry Hart. The Northern Advocate reported that the Judges direction (to find McIntyre not guilty) sic "..came after two days of intense legal argument between McIntyre's lawyers Barry Hart and Antony Shaw and Crown prosecutor Kim Thomas..". The paper went on to report that after the verdict was delivered "..a relieved Mr McIntyre said a "hellish" two-and-a-half-years fighting the charges were now over and he could get on with his life and farming. "I feel really relieved. I wasn't expecting this but I was hoping for it," he said.."

R v Alan Duff - District Court 2008
In 2008, Shaw successfully represented Author and writer of Once Were Warriors Alan Duff MBE. Duff was found not guilty of failing to remain at a scene after being stopped by police. In September 2007 Duff was stopped for speeding but drove off after producing his licence and address. The Judges verdict followed a 3 day hearing where the Rotorua Daily Post reported that in closing submission Shaw submitted "..Duff gave the police officer who stopped him, Constable Patricia Foden, his driver's licence and address before she went back to her patrol car to make further inquiries about him. Duff was not obliged to remain and Ms Foden could have sent Duff a speeding infringement notice..". In the Courts written decision Judge McGuire said "..although Duff displayed more anger than may have been wise, he complied with the officer by producing his licence and providing his address..." The Judge went on to say In his written decision that the Police Officers "...request for him to wait while she made further inquiries went beyond the provisions of the Land Transport Act..". The Judge said that "..whilst there could be very sound practical and pragmatic reasons to "give carte blanche" to inquiries such as those undertaken by the Police officer in Duff's case, ". .. there are certainly arguments to the contrary that they are an unwarranted and further erosion of human rights..". In the decision the Judge detailed that Constable Patricia Foden pulled Duff over and told him he'd been going 112km/h. Duff had disputed the speed and during the heated exchange that followed he was threatened with pepper-spray, pursued for 3.5km and handcuffed twice before being taken to the police station and charged with failing to remain at a scene. More than three months later, police added two counts of resisting arrest, which were withdrawn by the Police shortly before the Judge issued his decision. In his decision Judge McGuire expressed concern at the lag between the two sets of charges, and called the evidence given by the Constable for the resisting arrest charges "unpersuasive". The Police appealed the Judges verdict. In the 2009 Appeal Decision, Justice Paul Heath said in his written decision that "an officer was empowered to require a driver to remain stopped for as long as was reasonably necessary to undertake a query on any issues relevant to enforcement powers or duties under the Transport Act." The Judge went on to say that he found the District Court Judge erred in his interpretation of the law, but he was not prepared to interfere with the judge's decision to dismiss the charges, Justice Heath said "In the exercise of my discretion, I do not order a rehearing of the informations.......The facts of the case did not justify another hearing and there was no clear evidence on the extent of inquiries undertaken by the arresting constable," he said. Accordingly, Duff was not convicted of any charges.

Morse v Queen - Supreme Court 2010 - Also known as "The Flag Burning Case"
In 2010, Shaw successfully represented "Flag Burner" Valerie Morse in the New Zealand Supreme Court before Supreme Court Justices Elias CJ, Blanchard, Tipping, McGrath and Anderson JJ. Morse's conviction was quashed. Morse was previously convicted of behaving in an offensive manner following her burning of a New Zealand Flag at the Wellington Cenotaph at a dawn service on Anzac day 2007 (which she freely admitted), Morse claimed that she did so in protest of New Zealands military involvement in the Afghanistan war. (decision released 2011)

R (The Queen) v (Waihopai Spy Base Protestors) - District Court 2010
In 2010 Shaw also successfully defended a client who had been charged with breaking into the high security New Zealand/US Spy Base. The New Zealand Herald reported that despite the 3 men admitting that they had broken into the spy base and despite a long and involved trial, the Jury took just two hours to find each man not guilty. In 2008 the men were each charged with two charges of wilful damage and one of burglary, after breaking into the Waihopai Spy Base Facility operated by the New Zealand Government’s Communications Security Bureau (GCSB). At the time the Government claimed that the individuals had committed over $1 million of damage

Notable publications
Human Rights Law Thomson Reuters -  Antony Shaw & Andrew Butler (Human Rights Reports of New Zealand (HRNZ))
Alternative Shadow Report 2009 (T. Ellis & A. Shaw) - Provided to the United Nations
A Standard for Justice: A Commentary on the Draft Bill of Rights for New Zealand – June 5, 1986 by Jerome B. Elkind & Antony Shaw Paperback: 128 pages, Publisher: Oxford University Press (June 5, 1986), Language: English,

References

20th-century New Zealand lawyers
Year of birth missing (living people)
Living people
21st-century New Zealand lawyers